The Malta Girl Guides Association (MGGA) is the national Guiding association of Malta. Guiding in Malta started in 1918 and the association became a member of the World Association of Girl Guides and Girl Scouts (WAGGGS) in 1966. The girls-only association has 1,337 members (as of 2003).

History 
Guiding in Malta began in 1918 for British girls as part of The Guide Association (UK). In 1923, Maltese girls formed a separate organization. Both organizations merged in 1938, although there remained some groups of British Guides. 

In 1966, two years after the independence of Malta, the MGGA became an associate member of the WAGGGS. The association gained full WAGGGS-membership in 1972, and the last groups of British Guides left the island in 1978.

Program 
The aim of the association is to "enable young girls and young women to develop good character formation and to discover their potential through an interactive programme giving a positive sense of direction and a world of opportunities as responsible citizens".

The association is divided in four age-groups:
 Dolphins (ages 5 to 7)
 Brownies (ages 7 to 10)
 Guides (ages 10 to 14)
 Rangers (ages 14 to 18)

The program is divided into eight areas:
 Environment
 Skills
 Culture and Heritage
 Health
 Creativity
 Local & International Guiding
 Service
 Mind & Spirit

See also 
 The Scout Association of Malta

References

Further reading

 World Association of Girl Guides and Girl Scouts, World Bureau (1997), Trefoil Round the World. Eleventh Edition 1997. 

World Association of Girl Guides and Girl Scouts member organizations
Scouting and Guiding in Malta
Youth organizations established in 1918